The  Ministry of Education (abbreviated MOE) is the Myanmar government agency responsible for education in Myanmar.

Brief History 
The Ministry of Education aims to nurture future oriented advanced science and technology professionals, support national economic development and promote research. In order to rectify and strengthen the purposes, Ministry of Education expanded into new Ministry of Science and Technology in 1996. This ministry focused on research and development, intellectual property, standardization, quality assuring, basic infrastructure development, nuclear safety and human resource development. In 2016, the five departments from Ministry of Science and Technology merged with Ministry of Education with the aim of forming momentum in national development. Currently, Ministry of Education is taking control in national development with four categories.

 Research and development category
 Human resource development category
 Foreign collaboration and co-operation category
 Rural development category

On 17 June, 2021, the State Administration Council reformed the Ministry of Education as the Ministry of Education and the Ministry of Science and Technology.

Departmental bodies 

 The Minister's Office
 Department of Higher Education
 Department of Teacher Training
 Department of Human Resources and Educational Planning
 Department of Basic Education
 Myanmar Language Commission
 Department of Myanmar Examinations
 Department of Myanmar Education Research Bureau (MERB)

There are seven departments under the Ministry of Education:
 Administration staff
 Department of Higher Education
 Department of Basic Education
 Department of Myanmar Language Commission
 Department of Myanmar Board of Examinations
 Myanmar Educational Research Bureau (MERB)

The Office Staff of the Ministry of Education is responsible to the Deputy Ministers and the Minister. They supervise the implementation of educational programmes, set the educational policies, are responsible for fiscal planning within the ministry and department personnel and administration of the ministry.

List of ministers 
 Dr Ba Maw (1934–1937)
 U Razak (1947) 
 Htoon Aung Kyaw
 U Win
 Hla Min
 Maung Gyi
 U Kar (1958-1960) 
 Dr. Nyi Nyi
 Col. Hla Han
 Col. Dr. Pe Thein
 Pan Aung
 Than Aung (1997-2004)
 Dr Chan Nyein (2004-2011)
 Dr Mya Aye (minister) (2011-2013)
 Dr Khin San Yee (2014–30 March 2016)
 Aung San Suu Kyi (30 March 2016 – 6 April 2016)
 Dr Myo Thein Gyi (6 April 2016 - 1 February 2021)
 Dr Nyunt Pe (16 February 2021 - Incumbent)

References

External links 
 

Education
Myanmar
Education in Myanmar
Ministries established in 1950
1950 establishments in Burma